Jack Brandenburg (born October 22, 1951) is a retired Republican Michigan state senator. He was elected to office in 2010. Previously he had served for six years as a member of the Michigan House of Representatives and a member of that body's appropriations committee.

Brandenburg was born in Canton, Ohio. He has a bachelor's degree from Ashland University.

Brandenburg is a businessman who founded and owns Blue Water Industrial Supply, a company headquartered in Mount Clemens, Michigan.  Brandenburg lives in Harrison Township, Michigan.

Prior to his election to the state house in 2002, Brandenburg had served as a member of the board of the Huron-Clinton Metro Parks Authority.

Brandenburg and his wife Karen Linenger are the parents of four children. Brandenburg is a Roman Catholic.

References

External links 
Brandenburg's campaign bio
Michigan Votes entry on Brandenburg
Michigan Legislature bio of Brandenburg
September 30, 2010 Macomb Daily bio of Brandenburg
Project Vote Smart bio of Brandenburg

1951 births
Ashland University alumni
Republican Party Michigan state senators
Republican Party members of the Michigan House of Representatives
People from Macomb County, Michigan
Living people
21st-century American politicians